Roberto Carretero Díaz (born 30 August 1975) is a Spanish former professional tennis player. He won one singles title, the 1996 Hamburg AMS.

Tennis career
Carretero, a former junior French Open Champion, shocked the tennis world by winning the Masters Series title in Hamburg in 1996 as a virtually unknown player ranked only No. 143. En route to the title he defeated two top 100 players, two top 20 players (Washington and Boetsch), and most notably, Yevgeny Kafelnikov in the semi-finals, and Àlex Corretja in the final. After winning the title, Carretero lost in the first round of Roland Garros and did not have any significant results other than winning a Challenger tournament held in Sopot, Poland in 1999.

He retired from professional tennis after the 2001 season.

ATP career finals

Singles: 2(1 title)

ATP Challenger and ITF Futures finals

Singles: 3 (2–1)

Performance timeline

Singles

Wins over top 10 players

Junior Grand Slam finals

Singles: 1 (1 title)

References

External links
 
 

1975 births
Living people
Tennis players from Madrid
Spanish male tennis players
French Open junior champions
Grand Slam (tennis) champions in boys' singles